Iryna V'iacheslavivna Sekachova (born 21 July 1976 in Vasylkiv, Kyiv) is a Ukrainian hammer thrower. Her personal best throw is 74.52 metres, achieved in July 2008 in Kyiv.

Achievements

References
 
  Page at the National Olympic Committee of Ukraine, with picture

1976 births
Living people
Ukrainian female hammer throwers
Athletes (track and field) at the 2000 Summer Olympics
Athletes (track and field) at the 2004 Summer Olympics
Athletes (track and field) at the 2008 Summer Olympics
Olympic athletes of Ukraine
Competitors at the 2001 Summer Universiade
Sportspeople from Kyiv Oblast